Judith Ann Graley (born 26 January 1957) is an Australian politician.

Graley was born in Sunshine, Victoria, and graduated from Sunshine West High School in 1974. She attended La Trobe University from 1975 to 1978, receiving a BA (Hons), and went on to receive a Diploma of Education from the University of Melbourne in 1979. In 1980 she returned to La Trobe University as a tutor in the Department of Politics, and the following year became a secondary teacher at Footscray.

Judith Graley served as a local government councillor for the Mornington Peninsula Shire Council from 1997 to 2003 and was its mayor from 2000 to 2001.

She was a tutor at the University of Melbourne from 1995 to 2000, and in 2002 became electorate officer to Labor MP Alistair Harkness; she worked for Tim Holding from 2004.

In 2006, Graley was elected to the Victorian Legislative Assembly as the Labor member for Narre Warren South, having defeated sitting member Dale Wilson for preselection. Graley had been supported by the Labor Right faction. She did not seek re-election at the 2018 state election, and retired in October 2018.

References

External links
 Parliamentary voting record of Judith Graley at Victorian Parliament Tracker

1957 births
Living people
Australian Labor Party members of the Parliament of Victoria
Labor Right politicians
Members of the Victorian Legislative Assembly
21st-century Australian politicians
Women members of the Victorian Legislative Assembly
People from Sunshine, Victoria
Australian schoolteachers
La Trobe University alumni
University of Melbourne alumni
Politicians from Melbourne
21st-century Australian women politicians